Isaac Wayne (1772October 25, 1852) was an American politician from Pennsylvania who served as a Federalist Party member of the U.S. House of Representatives for Pennsylvania's 4th congressional district from 1823 to 1825. He served as a member of the Pennsylvania House of Representatives from 1799 to 1801 and in 1806.  He served as a member of the Pennsylvania State Senate from 1807 to 1810. He was the son of the American Revolutionary War General Anthony Wayne, and grandson of Pennsylvania Provincial Assembly member Isaac Wayne.

Biography
Wayne was born in 1772 at Waynesborough, the family estate in Easttown Township, Pennsylvania to American Revolutionary War General Anthony Wayne and Mary Penrose Wayne. He graduated from Dickinson College in Carlisle, Pennsylvania, in 1792, then studied law and was admitted to the Chester County, Pennsylvania, bar in 1795.  He was a member of the Pennsylvania House of Representatives from 1799 to 1801 and 1806, and served in the Pennsylvania State Senate from 1807 to 1810.

During the War of 1812, Wayne was captain of a troop of Pennsylvania Horse Cavalry, raised and equipped by himself, and was subsequently colonel of the Second Regiment, Pennsylvania Volunteer Infantry.

Wayne unsuccessfully ran as a Federalist candidate for governor in 1814, but was elected to the Eighteenth Congress.

Personal life
On August 25, 1802, he married Elizabeth Smith and together they had five children.

In 1809, Isaac traveled to Fort Presque Isle to disinter his father from his burial site there.  The body was in surprisingly good shape and since no embalming was available at the time, the flesh was boiled off the bones and re-buried at Fort Presque Isle.  Isaac transported his father's bones 300 miles East across Pennsylvania and reinterred them in St. David's Episcopal Church in Radnor, Pennsylvania.

In 1829, he published a memoir of his father and his military career in The Casket.

In 1840, Wayne was elected as a member to the American Philosophical Society.

Isaac died at the family estate in Easttown Township, Pennsylvania on October 25, 1852.  He is buried in the family plot at St. David's Episcopal Church in Radnor, Pennsylvania.

Bibliography
Biographical Memoir of Major General Anthony Wayne, The Casket No. 5, pages 190-203, Philadelphia, May 1829

Citations

Sources
The Political Graveyard
Encyclopedia Dickinsonia

1772 births
1852 deaths
19th-century American lawyers
19th-century American male writers
19th-century American politicians
American militia officers
American militiamen in the War of 1812
Burials at St. David's Episcopal Church (Radnor, Pennsylvania)
Federalist Party members of the United States House of Representatives from Pennsylvania
Members of the American Philosophical Society
Members of the Pennsylvania House of Representatives
Military personnel from Pennsylvania
Pennsylvania lawyers
Pennsylvania state senators
People from Paoli, Pennsylvania